Dimitri Durand (born April 2, 1982 in Champigny-sur-Marne) is a French former professional footballer who played as a striker.

External links
 
 
 

1982 births
Living people
People from Champigny-sur-Marne
Footballers from Val-de-Marne
Association football midfielders
French footballers
Association football forwards
US Créteil-Lusitanos players
AS Cherbourg Football players
Red Star F.C. players
PFC Lokomotiv Plovdiv players
FCM Aubervilliers players
Villemomble Sports players
Ligue 2 players
Championnat National players
Championnat National 2 players
Championnat National 3 players
First Professional Football League (Bulgaria) players
Expatriate footballers in Bulgaria